Events from the year 1799 in the United States.

Incumbents

Federal Government 
 President: John Adams (F-Massachusetts)
 Vice President: Thomas Jefferson (DR-Virginia)
 Chief Justice: Oliver Ellsworth (Connecticut)
 Speaker of the House of Representatives: Jonathan Dayton (F-New Jersey) (until March 4), Theodore Sedgwick (F-Massachusetts) (starting December 2)
 Congress: 5th (until March 4), 6th (starting March 4)

Events

 January 30 – Congress passes the Logan Act, forbidding unauthorized citizens from negotiating with foreign governments, in response to George Logan's unofficial attempt to negotiate peace between the U.S. and France.
 February – Fries's Rebellion, an armed tax revolt among Pennsylvania Dutch farmers, begins as John Fries organizes meetings to discuss a collective response to the taxes imposed to raise funds for the Quasi-War.
 February 7 – Marc Isambard Brunel leaves the United States.
 February 9 – Quasi-War: In the action of 9 February 1799, the USS Constellation captures the French frigate Insurgente.
 March 1 – Federalist James Ross becomes President Pro Tempore of the United States Senate.
 March 29 – New York passes a law aimed at gradually abolishing slavery in the state.
 April 10 – Ellicott's Stone is placed by a U.S.-Spanish survey party headed by Andrew Ellicott.
 July 8 – The Russian-American Company is founded.
 December 3 – The Kentucky state legislature passes the second of its resolutions as part of the Kentucky and Virginia Resolutions. Although the first of Kentucky's resolutions (in 1798) were authored by Thomas Jefferson, the author of the 1799 Resolutions is not known with certainty.
 December 14 – Former President George Washington dies at his home in Mount Vernon, Virginia.

Undated
 Carolina Gold Rush: 12-year-old Conrad John Reed finds what he describes as a "heavy yellow rock" along Little Meadow Creek in Cabarrus County, North Carolina and makes it a doorstop in his home. Conrad's father John Reed learns that the rock is actually gold in 1802, initiating the first gold rush in the U.S.
 Eli Whitney, holding a January 1798 U.S. government contract for the manufacture of muskets, is introduced by Oliver Wolcott Jr. to the French concept of interchangeable parts, an origin of the American system of manufacturing.
 Reconstruction of The Cabildo in New Orleans is completed.

Ongoing
 Quasi-War (1798–1800)

Births
 January 6 – Jedediah Smith, explorer, hunter, trapper and fur trader (died 1831)
 March 8 – Simon Cameron, journalist, editor and 26th United States Secretary of War from 1861 to 1862 (died 1889)
 April 3 – John Pendleton King, U.S. Senator from Georgia from 1833 to 1837 (died 1888)
 April 12 – Samuel McRoberts, U.S. Senator from Illinois from 1841 to 1843 (died 1843)
 July 6 – Louisa Caroline Huggins Tuthill, writer for children (died 1879)
 July 19 – William McSherry, Jesuit priest (died 1839)
 September 10 – George Willison Adams, abolitionist (died 1879)
 October 1 – John Brown Russwurm, Americo-Liberian journalist and governor of the African Republic of Maryland (died 1851)
 November 1 – Thomas Baldwin Marsh, religious leader (died 1866)
 November 15 – James A. Bayard Jr., U.S. Senator from Delaware from 1851 to 1864 (died 1880)
 November 29 – Amos Bronson Alcott, philosopher, educator and writer (died 1888)
 December 3 – Peggy Eaton, born Margaret O'Neill, wife of U.S. Secretary of State John Eaton and central character of the Petticoat affair (died 1879)
 December 27 – Walter T. Colquitt, U.S. Senator from Georgia from 1843 to 1848 (died 1855)

Deaths
 June 6 – Patrick Henry, first & sixth Governor of Virginia from 1776 to 1779 and from 1784 to 1786 (born 1736)
 June 7 – Increase Sumner, lawyer, justice and fifth Governor of Massachusetts from 1797 (born 1746)
 October 13 – William Paca, judge and third Governor of Maryland from 1782 to 1785, signatory to the Declaration of Independence (born 1740)
 December 14 – George Washington, first President of the United States from 1789 to 1797 (born 1732)
 December – William Cliffton, poet (born 1772)

See also
Timeline of United States history (1790–1819)

References

Further reading
 John Lathrop. Effects of Lightning on Several Persons in the House of Samuel Carey Esq. of Chelsea, August 2, 1799. Memoirs of the American Academy of Arts and Sciences, Vol. 3, No. 1 (1809), pp. 82–85.
 Carlos E. Godfrey. Organization of the Provisional Army of the United States in the Anticipated War with France, 1798–1800. The Pennsylvania Magazine of History and Biography, Vol. 38, No. 2 (1914), pp. 129–132
 Letters from William and Mary College, 1798–1801. The Virginia Magazine of History and Biography, Vol. 29, No. 2 (April, 1921), pp. 129–179.
 William H. Gaines Jr. The Forgotten Army: Recruiting for a National Emergency (1799–1800). The Virginia Magazine of History and Biography, Vol. 56, No. 3 (July, 1948), pp. 267–279
 George W. Kyte. Guns for Charleston: A Case of Lend-Lease in 1798–1799. The Journal of Southern History, Vol. 14, No. 3 (August, 1948), pp. 401–408.
 Rex A. Skidmore. Penological Pioneering in the Walnut Street Jail, 1789–1799. Journal of Criminal Law and Criminology (1931–1951), Vol. 39, No. 2 (July  – August, 1948), pp. 167–180 .
 Patricia Holbert Menk. D. M. Erskine: Letters from America, 1798–1799. The William and Mary Quarterly, Third Series, Vol. 6, No. 2 (April, 1949), pp. 251–284.
 Charles Caleb Cotton and Julien Dwight Martin. The Letters of Charles Caleb Cotton, 1798–1802. The South Carolina Historical and Genealogical Magazine, Vol. 51, No. 4 (October, 1950), pp. 216–228. Covers the year 1799.
 Robert C. Smith. A Portuguese Naturalist in Philadelphia, 1799. The Pennsylvania Magazine of History and Biography, Vol. 78, No. 1 (January, 1954), pp. 71–106
 James Morton Smith. The Federalist "Saints" versus "The Devil of Sedition": The Liberty Pole Cases of Dedham, Massachusetts, 1798–1799. The New England Quarterly, Vol. 28, No. 2 (June, 1955), pp. 198–215.
 Stephen G. Kurtz. The French Mission of 1799–1800: Concluding Chapter in the Statecraft of John Adams. Political Science Quarterly, Vol. 80, No. 4 (December, 1965), pp. 543–557.
 Peter J. Parker. Asbury Dickins, Bookseller, 1798–1801, or, the Brief Career of a Careless Youth. The Pennsylvania Magazine of History and Biography, Vol. 94, No. 4 (October, 1970), pp. 464–483.
 Steven H. Hochman. On the Liberty of the Press in Virginia: From Essay to Bludgeon, 1798–1803. The Virginia Magazine of History and Biography, Vol. 84, No. 4 (October, 1976), pp. 431–445.
 William J. Murphy Jr. John Adams: The Politics of the Additional Army, 1798–1800. The New England Quarterly, Vol. 52, No. 2 (June, 1979), pp. 234–249.
 Thomas M. Ray. "Not One Cent for Tribute": The Public Addresses and American Popular Reaction to the XYZ Affair, 1798–1799. Journal of the Early Republic, Vol. 3, No. 4 (Winter, 1983), pp. 389–412.
 Paul Douglas Newman. Fries's Rebellion and American Political Culture, 1798–1800. The Pennsylvania Magazine of History and Biography, Vol. 119, No. 1/2 (January  – April, 1995), pp. 37–73.
 Robert H. Churchill. Popular Nullification, Fries' Rebellion, and the Waning of Radical Republicanism, 1798–1801. Pennsylvania History, Vol. 67, No. 1, Fries' Rebellion (Winter 2000), pp. 105–140.
 Andy Trees. Private Correspondence for the Public Good: Thomas Jefferson to Elbridge Gerry, January 26, 1799. The Virginia Magazine of History and Biography, Vol. 108, No. 3 (2000), pp. 217–254.
 Robert S. Woodbury. The Legend of Eli Whitney and Interchangeable Parts. Technology and Culture, Vol. 1 (1960).

External links
 

 
1790s in the United States
United States
United States
Years of the 18th century in the United States